Figeac Aero is a company specializing in the subcontracting of aeronautical equipment. By 2023, it is the leading European subcontractor in the sector. The company produces large parts, engine parts, precision parts and sub-assemblies. Listed on the stock exchange since 2013, the company has achieved a turnover of 226 million euros in 2022.

Jean-Claude Maillard founded the company in 1989.

References

External links

 Company official website

 

Aerospace companies of France
Aircraft manufacturers of France
French brands
French companies established in 1989
Companies listed on Euronext Paris